Come Away Home is a 2005 American family drama film directed by Doug McKeon, and written by Stephen Zakman, and later the inspiration for the novel of the same name by Robert D. Slane. The film stars Jordan-Claire Green as Annie Lamm, Lea Thompson and Thomas Gibson as her parents, and Paul Dooley as her grandfather.  The film had theatrical release April 29, 2005, and was released to DVD February 5, 2008.

Plot 
While she had planned to spend her summer in New York, Annie Lamm's (Jordan-Claire Green) parents Carol (Lea Thompson) and Gary (Thomas Gibson) force her to spend the summer with her grandfather Donald (Paul Dooley) in Hilton Head, South Carolina. She hates being forced and thinks her summer is ruined, but after her effort to sneak back to New York was stymied, and after nearly drowning in his rickety old boat and then being rescued, she develops a greater appreciation for both her grandfather and the island where he lives. When summer comes to the end, she learns her parents intend placing her grandfather in a retirement home, and she has to convince them otherwise.

Cast

Reception 
Pittsburgh City Paper noted that the film "never probes its dysfunctional family roots very deep, preferring instead to present a winsome if not entirely realistic portrait of a simple summer that can change a dozen lives for the better," and concluded the film's "lessons about sharing, family and resolving life's woes are well intended, if a little well worn." Savannah Morning News generally praised the project, writing it was "a remarkably well made film that underscores the importance of family and should make Hilton Head residents proud of their hometown".  Atlanta Journal-Constitution also praised, writing “Some of the acting was unprofessional but [it is] otherwise a great family movie to watch with your kids.”

Accolades 

 2006, won 'Best Motion Picture - Drama' by International Family Film Festival
 2006, won 'Best Feature Film - Drama' by International Family Film Festival 
 2006, received Young Artist Awards nomination for 'Best Performance in a Feature Film (Comedy or Drama) - Leading Young Actress' for Jordan-Claire Green

References

External links 
 
 

2005 films
2000s teen drama films
American coming-of-age drama films
American teen drama films
American independent films
2005 drama films
2005 independent films
2000s English-language films
2000s American films